Lago del Turano (Latin Tolenus) is a lake in the Province of Rieti, Lazio, Italy. At an elevation of 536 m, its surface area is 5.6 km².

Lakes of Lazio